The 2014 Washington Kastles season was the seventh season of the franchise in World TeamTennis (WTT).

The Kastles won their fourth consecutive King Trophy when they defeated the Springfield Lasers in the WTT Championship Match. The Kastles were led by Martina Hingis who was named WTT Final Most Valuable Player.

Season recap

Drafts
With the Kastles winning the WTT championship in 2013, they had the last pick in each round of both WTT drafts. In the marquee player draft, the Kastles chose Martina Hingis and Venus Williams both of whom they had protected. The Kastles protected Leander Paes, Bobby Reynolds and Anastasia Rodionova from their 2013 squad in the roster draft. With Hingis committed to playing full-time, the Kastles knew they did not need all four of their picks in the roster draft. So, they traded their first round pick to the Springfield Lasers in exchange for the Lasers' third round pick and financial consideration. The Lasers used the pick they acquired from the Kastles to select Anna-Lena Grönefeld. The Kastles passed on the third round pick (20th overall) that they acquired in the trade with the Lasers.

New home venue
In May 2014, the Kastles announced they were moving to Kastles Stadium at the Charles E. Smith Center an indoor venue on the campus of George Washington University in the Foggy Bottom neighborhood of Washington, D.C. The stadium has a seating capacity of 3,212 for Kastles matches.

Other player transactions
On July 6, 2014, the Kastles announced the signings of Jarmila Gajdošová as a substitute player and Kevin Anderson as a wildcard player. On July 18, 2014, the Kastles signed Shelby Rogers as a substitute player. On July 22, the Kastles signed Sloane Stephens as a wildcard player.

Before the Eastern Conference Championship Match, Bobby Reynolds announced that he would retire from professional tennis at the end of the 2014 WTT season.

Season opener
On July 7, 2014, the Kastles opened their season with a dominant 24–16 overtime win on the road against the Boston Lobsters. The Kastles won the first four sets of the match led by Leander Paes and Bobby Reynolds (5–4 in men's doubles), Jarmila Gajdošová and Anastasia Rodionova (5–2 in women's doubles), Reynolds (5–3 in men's singles) and Rodionova (5–1 in women's singles) to build a 20–10 lead. After losing the fifth set of mixed doubles, Gajdošová and Paes won the second game of overtime to seal the match. The win was the Kastles' 13th straight victory going back to the 2013 season.

Home opener at new stadium
On July 9, 2014, in their first-ever match at the new Kastles Stadium at the Charles E. Smith Center, the Kastles hosted the Boston Lobsters and won all five sets to cruise to their 15th straight win by a score of 25–8. The Kastles got set wins from Martina Hingis and Leander Paes (5–1 in mixed doubles), Hingis (5–0 in women's singles), Kevin Anderson (5–1 in men's singles), Hingis and Anastasia Rodionova (5–2 in women's doubles) and Bobby Reynolds and Paes (5–4 in men's doubles). The victory improved the Kastles' record to 3 wins and 0 losses.

Dominant set-winning streak
On July 13, 2014, the Kastles' incredible 20-set winning streak came to an end when Leander Paes and Bobby Reynolds dropped the third set of men's doubles in the season's sixth match against the Philadelphia Freedoms. The streak began when Jarmila Gajdošová and Paes won the third set of the second match of the season. Even though they dropped a set, the Kastles got set wins Bobby Reynolds (5–1 in men's singles), Martina Hingis and Anastasia Rodionova (5–3 in women's doubles), Hingis (5–1 in women's singles) and Hingis and Paes (5–4 in mixed doubles) to earn a 23–14 victory, improve their record to 6 wins and 0 losses and extend their winning streak to 18 consecutive matches.

Winning streak snapped
On July 14, 2014, the Kastles saw their 18-match winning streak come to an end when the dropped four of five sets at home against the San Diego Aviators and fell by a score of 22–18.

Playoff berth
On July 18, 2014, despite losing their second straight match and third of the last four to fall to a record of 7 wins and 3 losses, the Kastles clinched their fourth consecutive playoff berth when the Philadelphia Freedoms defeated the Boston Lobsters, 25–14. The Kastles' 24–10 road loss to the Springfield Lasers was the worst defeat in franchise history.

Kastles clinch home-court advantage
On July 22, 2014, the Kastles won their third straight match and improved their record to 10 wins and 3 losses with a 23–15 victory over the Springfield Lasers to clinch home-court advantage for the Eastern Conference Championship Match. The Kastles got set wins from Sloane Stephens (5–2 in women's singles), Leander Paes and Bobby Reynolds (5–4 in men's doubles), Martina Hingis and Anastasia Rodionova (5—2 in women's doubles) and Hingis and Paes (5–2 in mixed doubles).

Eastern Conference Championship
On July 24, 2014, the Kastles won their fourth consecutive Eastern Conference Championship with a 21–16 overtime victory at home against the Philadelphia Freedoms. Bobby Reynolds got the Kastles started winning the first 10 point of the match on his way to a 5–3 set win in men's singles over Frank Dancevic. Taylor Townsend's 5–2 win over Martina Hingis in women's singles gave the Freedoms an 8–7 lead. Hingis bounced back in mixed doubles teaming with Leander Paes for a 5–2 set win over Liezel Huber and Marcelo Melo to put the Kastles back in front, 12–10. In a bizarre scene during the fourth set of women's doubles, Huber was struck in the back of the head by a Townsend forehand shot. Huber was unable to continue. She was diagnosed with a concussion, taken to the hospital and later released. With no substitute available, Townsend was left to finish the set alone. Playing two against one, Townsend was not permitted to return serves on Huber's side and dropped the set, 5–1, to give the Kastles a commanding 17–11 lead. Dancevic and Melo took the final set of men's doubles, 5–3, from Paes and Reynolds to cut the Kastles' lead to 20–16 and send the match to overtime. Paes and Reynolds won the first game of overtime to close out the match.

King Trophy
On July 27, 2014, the Kastles won their fourth consecutive King Trophy as World TeamTennis Champions with a dominant 25–13 victory over the Springfield Lasers in Springfield, Missouri. Although WTT predetermined that the Western Conference champion would host the WTT Final, the Kastles, as the higher seed, were treated as the "home" team in determining order of play. The Kastles won all five sets en route to the title, They were led by Martina Hingis who was named WTT Finals Most Valuable Player after earning a 5–2 win over Olga Govortsova in the second set of women's singles, teaming with Anastasia Rodionova for a 5–1 win over Govortsova and Līga Dekmeijere in the fourth set of women's doubles and closing out the match with Leander Paes with a 5–4 mixed doubles win over Govortsova and Ross Hutchins. Bobby Reynolds, playing the final professional tennis match of his career, got the Kastles started with a 5–4 men's singles win over Michael Russell in the first set before teaming with Paes for a 5–2 men's doubles win over Hutchins and Russell in the fourth set. The Kastles' fourth consecutive championship matched the WTT record set by the Sacramento Capitals who won four straight from 1997 to 2000.

Event chronology
 February 11, 2014: The Kastles selected Martina Hingis and Venus Williams, both of whom they had protected, in the WTT Marquee Player Draft.
 March 11, 2014: The Kastles selected Leander Paes, Bobby Reynolds and Anastasia Rodionova, all of whom they had protected, in the WTT Roster Player Draft.
 July 6, 2014: The Kastles signed Jarmila Gajdošová as a substitute player and Kevin Anderson as a wildcard player.
 July 9, 2014: The Kastles played their first match at their new home venue, Kastles Stadium at the Charles E. Smith Center, and defeated the Boston Lobsters, 25–8.
 July 18, 2014: The Kastles signed Shelby Rogers as a substitute player.
 July 18, 2014: Despite suffering their worst loss in franchise history, a 24–10 road drubbing at the hands of the Springfield Lasers, the Kastles clinched their fourth consecutive playoff berth with a record of 7 wins and 3 losses when the Philadelphia Freedoms defeated the Boston Lobsters.
 July 22, 2014: The Kastles signed Sloane Stephens as a wildcard player.
 July 22, 2014: The Kastles won their third straight match and improved their record to 10 wins and 3 losses with a 23–15 victory over the Springfield Lasers to clinch home-court advantage for the Eastern Conference Championship Match.
 July 24, 2014: The Kastles defeated the Philadelphia Freedoms 21–16 in overtime to win their fourth consecutive Eastern Conference Championship.
 July 27, 2014: The Kastles defeated the Springfield Lasers 25–13 to win their fourth consecutive King Trophy as World TeamTennis Champions. Martina Hingis was named WTT Finals Most Valuable Player.

Draft picks
Since the Kastles won the WTT Championship in 2013, they had the last selection in each round of both WTT drafts.

Marquee player draft
The Kastles protected both Martina Hingis and Venus Williams from their 2013 team. The selections made by the Kastles are shown in the table below.
 

Martina Hingis committed to playing full-time for the Kastles for the 2014 season.

Roster player draft
With Hingis committed to playing full-time, the Kastles knew they would not need all four of their draft choices. The Springfield Lasers had their eyes on an unprotected player and were willing to deal for the Kastles' top pick. The Kastles traded the seventh selection in the first round to the Lasers in exchange for the sixth selection in the third round (20th overall) and financial consideration. With the pick they acquired from the Kastles, the Lasers selected Anna-Lena Grönefeld. The selections made by the Kastles are shown in the table below.

Match log

Regular season
{| align="center" border="1" cellpadding="2" cellspacing="1" style="border:1px solid #aaa"
|-
! colspan="2" style="background:navy; color:#fff" | Legend
|-
! bgcolor="ccffcc" | Kastles Win
! bgcolor="ffbbbb" | Kastles Loss
|-
! colspan="2" | Home team in CAPS
|}

Playoffs
{| align="center" border="1" cellpadding="2" cellspacing="1" style="border:1px solid #aaa"
|-
! colspan="2" style="background:navy; color:#fff" | Legend
|-
! bgcolor="ccffcc" | Kastles Win
! bgcolor="ffbbbb" | Kastles Loss
|-
! colspan="2" | Home team in CAPS
|}
Eastern Conference Championship Match

World TeamTennis Championship Match

Note:

Team personnel
Reference:

On-court personnel
  Murphy Jensen, Coach
  Kevin Anderson
  Jarmila Gajdošová
  Martina Hingis
  Leander Paes
  Bobby Reynolds
  Anastasia Rodionova
  Shelby Rogers
  Sloane Stephens
  Venus Williams

Front office
 Mark D. Ein, Owner
 Kevin Wynne, General Manager

Notes:

Statistics
Players are listed in order of their game-winning percentage provided they played in at least 40% of the Kastles' games in that event, which is the WTT minimum for qualification for league leaders in individual statistical categories.

Men's singles – regular season

Women's singles – regular season

Men's doubles – regular season

Women's doubles – regular season

Mixed doubles – regular season

Team totals – regular season

Men's singles – playoffs

Women's singles – playoffs

Men's doubles – playoffs

Women's doubles – playoffs

Mixed doubles – playoffs

Team totals – playoffs

Men's singles – all matches

Women's singles – all matches

Men's doubles – all matches

Women's doubles – all matches

Mixed doubles – all matches

Team totals – all matches

Transactions
 March 11, 2014: The Kastles traded the seventh pick of the first round of the WTT roster draft to the Springfield Lasers in exchange for the sixth pick in the third round (number 20 overall) and financial consideration. The Lasers used the selection they acquired in the trade to draft Anna-Lena Grönefeld. The Kastles passed on using the selection they acquired in the trade.
 July 6, 2014: The Kastles signed Jarmila Gajdošová as a substitute player and Kevin Anderson as a wildcard player.
 July 18, 2014: The Kastles signed Shelby Rogers as a substitute player.
 July 22, 2014: The Kastles signed Sloane Stephens as a wildcard player.

Individual honors and achievements
Martina Hingis was named WTT Final Most Valuable Player.

Hingis led WTT in winning percentage in both women's singles and doubles and was third in mixed doubles during the regular season.

Anastasia Rodionova was second (behind Hingis) in winning percentage in women's doubles during the regular season.

Leander Paes was fourth in winning percentage in men's doubles and sixth in mixed doubles during the regular season.

Bobby Reynolds was fifth in winning percentage in men's doubles during the regular season.

Charitable support
During each night of the 2014 season, the WTT team with the most aces received US$1,000 toward a local charity of the team's choice as part of a program called Mylan Aces. In the case of a tie, the award was split accordingly. The Kastles earned $4,500 for the Boys & Girls Club of Greater Washington - Clubhouse #2 through the program.

See also

 2014 World TeamTennis season
 Sports in Washington, D.C.

References

External links
Washington Kastles official website
World TeamTennis official website

Washington Kastles season
Washington Kastles